Wiring is an open-source electronics prototyping platform composed of a programming language, an integrated development environment (IDE), and a single-board microcontroller. It was developed starting in 2003 by Hernando Barragán.

Barragán started the project at the Interaction Design Institute Ivrea. The project is currently developed at the School of Architecture and Design at the Universidad de Los Andes in Bogotá, Colombia.

Wiring builds on Processing, an open project initiated by Casey Reas and Benjamin Fry, both formerly of the Aesthetics and Computation Group at the MIT Media Lab.

Project experts, intermediate developers, and beginners from around the world share ideas, knowledge and their collective experience as a project community. Wiring makes it easy to create software for controlling devices attached to the electronics board to create various interactive devices. The concept of developing is to write a few lines of code, connect a few electronic components to the Wiring hardware and observe, for example, that a motion sensor controls a light when a person approaches it, write a few more lines, add another sensor, and see how this light changes when the illumination level in a room decreases. This process is called sketching with hardware; explore ideas quickly, select the more interesting ones, refine and produce prototypes in an iterative process.

Software
The Wiring IDE is a cross-platform application written in Java which is derived from the IDE made for the Processing programming language. It is designed to introduce programming and sketching with electronics to artists and designers.  It includes a code editor with features such as syntax highlighting, brace matching, and automatic indentation capable of compiling and uploading programs to the board with a single click.

The Wiring IDE includes a C/C++ library called "Wiring", which makes common input/output operations much easier.  Wiring programs are written in C++.  A minimal program requires only two functions:
: a function run once at the start of a program which can be used to define initial environment settings.
: a function called repeatedly until the board is powered off or reset.

A typical first program for a developer using a microcontroller is to blink a light-emitting diode (LED) on and off. In the Wiring environment, the user might write a program like this:

int ledPin = WLED;               // a name for the on-board LED

void setup () {
   pinMode(ledPin, OUTPUT);      // configure the pin for digital output
}

void loop () {
   digitalWrite(ledPin, HIGH);   // turn on the LED
   delay (1000);                 // wait one second (1000 milliseconds)
   digitalWrite(ledPin, LOW);    // turn off the LED
   delay (1000);                 // wait one second
}

When the user clicks the "Upload to Wiring hardware" button in the IDE, a copy of the code is written to a temporary file including a standard header file at the file beginning, and a simple main function appended.

The Wiring IDE uses the GNU toolchain and AVR Libc to compile programs, and uses avrdude to upload programs to the board.

Open-source hardware and software
The Wiring hardware reference designs are distributed under a Creative Commons Attribution Share-Alike 2.5 license and are available on the Wiring Web site. Layout and production files for the Wiring hardware are also available. The source code for the IDE and the hardware library are available and released under the GPLv2

See also 

 Arduino
 BASIC Stamp
 Fritzing
 Gumstix
 Make Controller Kit
 OOPic
 PICAXE
 Processing
 Rabbit Semiconductor
 Tinkerforge

Sources

External links

Internet of things
Microcontroller software
Object-oriented programming languages
Cross-platform software
Educational programming languages
Free computer libraries
Open-source hardware
Open hardware electronic devices